is a Japanese manga series written and illustrated by NON. It was serialized in Kodansha's Weekly Young Magazine from July 2014 to June 2019, with its chapters collected in nineteen tankōbon volumes. A nine-episode television drama adaptation was broadcast from January to March 2022.

Plot
Koharu finds that her boyfriend was a married man, who was cheating on his wife with her, and was the third guy to do so in a row. Desolate, Koharu decides to leave Tokyo and move back home, rejecting a future of love and marriage for simpler life. However, once she arrives, she discovers that the café that her parents ran is closed and they are heavily in debt. A man, Ryunosuke Date, who was following Koharu, offers her to pay their debt, but Koharu has to marry him. Koharu learns that her hometown has legalized polygamous marriages to counter declining birth rates and becomes Ryunosuke's third wife.

Characters

Koharu Date (née ) is the 22-year-old third wife of Ryunosuke. To save her family's home and café, she marries Ryunosuke and becomes his third wife. Koharu is short-tempered and often lashes out at slight annoyances. She was at first against polygamy and sexual intimacy due to past trauma caused by her exes, but she gradually resolves her issues as she comes to terms with her feelings for Ryunosuke, begins to get along with his other wives and becomes a bonding pillar in the Date family.

Ryunosuke Date is the 25-year-old husband of Yuzu, Madoka and Koharu. He is a former celebrity pianist and is currently unemployed due to quitting the stage from anxiety. He is greedy and is not willing to settle for less than what he desires, including his three wives whom he wants all at once.

Yuzu Date (née Ōtsu (大津)) is the 26-year-old first wife of Ryunosuke and is also the daughter of the town mayor who legalized polygamy. She has a typical gyaru look with notable large breasts. Despite her appearance, she does the majority of the domestic chores in the Date family and is a good cook. She is the mother of Ryunosuke's first child, Rinnosuke.

Madoka Date (née Saijō (西條)) is the 21-year-old second wife of Ryunosuke. She is a quiet beauty with short hair and often wears a kimono at home. Although she is the second wife, she has been with Ryunosuke the longest. She manages the family's financial allocations and spending habits. Madoka is the most jealous amongst Ryunosuke's wives and yearns the most for exclusivity with him.

Media

Manga
It was serialized in Kodansha's Weekly Young Magazine from July 23, 2014, to June 17, 2019. Kodansha collected its chapters in nineteen tankōbon volumes, released from November 6, 2014, to August 6, 2019.

In November 2020, Kodansha USA started the digital publication of the manga on January 5, 2021.

An epilogue mini series started in Weekly Young Magazine on January 17, 2022. The mini-series will last eight chapters.

Volume list

Drama
In October 2021, it was announced that the manga would be adapted into a television drama. The series is directed by Takashi Ninomiya and Kana Yamada, with Yamada also writing scripts for the series. It was broadcast for nine episodes on ABC from January 16 to March 13, 2022. The theme song is "Final Piece" by Hyde.

Reception
In 2018, the manga was nominated for the 42nd Kodansha Manga Award in the General category.

See also
Delivery Cinderella, another manga series by the same author
Adabana, another manga series by the same author

References

Further reading

External links
 

 

Asahi Broadcasting Corporation original programming
Drama anime and manga
Harem anime and manga
Kodansha manga
Marriage in anime and manga
Romance anime and manga
Seinen manga